The Women's 3000 metres steeplechase at the 2010 Commonwealth Games as part of the athletics programme was held at the Jawaharlal Nehru Stadium on Saturday 9 October 2010.

Records

Results

External links
2010 Commonwealth Games - Athletics

Women's 3000 metres steeplechase
2010
2010 in women's athletics